Basketball Illawarra is the governing body of basketball in the Illawarra region of New South Wales, Australia and is based in the city of Wollongong. The club fields both men's and women's teams in state representative conceptions including the semi-professional basketball competition the NBL1 East who compete as the 'Illawarra Hawks'.

Club history

Background 
The Illawarra Basketball Association was established in 1954 as a local basketball competition among seven teams who registered to play. Their first venue was the Unanderra Hostel before moving to their current home in 1965, Beaton Park Stadium. In 1979, Basketball Illawarra entered into the newly formed National Basketball League for its inaugural season that year. Since then, the NBL side has become largely independent of the Illawarra Basketball Association with separate ownership.

Representative Competitions 
Basketball Illawarra's senior men's and women's representative teams compete in the NBL1 East, formerly known as the Waratah League. Playing as the 'Illawarra Hawks', they were champions of the men's state premier division championship in 1998 and 1999 prior to the formation of the Waratah League. The Hawks men's side were champions of the inaugural Waratah League in 2001 and again in 2011.

The women's side were runners-up in the 2011 Waratah League season.

Venue 
The Hawks and recreational competitions operated by the association, play games at the Beaton Park Stadium, nicknamed 'The Snake Pit'. The stadium opened in 1965 and is located in the Illawarra suburb of Gwynneville, New South Wales. The stadium previously hosted home games for the professional NBL side of the same name until their move to WIN Entertainment Centre. The NBL side's front office is still based at the stadium and the team use it as a training facility.

References

External links

Waratah League teams
1954 establishments in Australia
Basketball teams established in 1954
Basketball teams in New South Wales
Sport in Wollongong